Pendrin is an anion exchange protein that in humans is encoded by the SLC26A4 gene (solute carrier family 26, member 4).
Pendrin was initially identified as a sodium-independent chloride-iodide exchanger with subsequent studies showing that it also accepts formate and bicarbonate as substrates. Pendrin is similar to the Band 3 transport protein found in red blood cells. Pendrin is the protein which is mutated in Pendred syndrome, which is an autosomal recessive disorder characterized by sensorineural hearing loss, goiter and a partial organification problem detectable by a positive perchlorate test.

Pendrin is responsible for mediating the electroneutral exchange of chloride (Cl−) for bicarbonate (HCO3−) across a plasma membrane in the chloride cells of freshwater fish.

By phylogenetic analysis, pendrin has been found to be a close relative of prestin present on the hair cells or organ of corti in the inner ear. Prestin is primarily an electromechanical transducer but pendrin is an ion transporter.

Function 

Pendrin is an ion exchanger found in many types of cells in the body. High levels of pendrin expression have been identified in the inner ear and thyroid. In the thyroid, pendrin mediates a component of the efflux of iodide across the apical membrane of the thyrocyte, which is critical for the formation of thyroid hormone. The exact function of pendrin in the inner ear remains unclear; however, pendrin may play a role in acid-base balance as a chloride-bicarbonate exchanger, regulate volume homeostasis through its ability to function as a chloride-formate exchanger or indirectly modulate the calcium concentration of the endolymph. Pendrin is also expressed in the kidney, and has been localized to the apical membrane of a population of intercalated cells in the cortical collecting duct where it is involved in bicarbonate secretion.

Clinical significance

Mutations in this gene are associated with Pendred syndrome, the most common form of syndromic deafness, an autosomal-recessive disease. Pendred syndrome is characterized by thyroid goiter and enlargement of the vestibular aqueduct resulting in deafness; however, despite being expressed in the kidney, individuals with Pendred syndrome do not show any kidney-related acid-base, or volume abnormalities under basal conditions. This is probably the result of other bicarbonate or chloride transporters in the kidney compensating for any loss of pendrin function. Only under extreme situations of salt depletion or metabolic alkalosis, or with inactivation of the sodium-chloride cotransporter, are fluid and electrolyte disorders manifested in these patients.  SLC26A4 is highly homologous to the SLC26A3 gene; they have similar genomic structures and this gene is located 3' of the SLC26A3 gene. The encoded protein has homology to sulfate transporters.

Another little-understood role of pendrin is in airway hyperreactivity and inflammation, as during asthma attacks and allergic reactions. Expression of pendrin in the lung increases in response to allergens and high concentrations of IL-13,  and overexpression of pendrin results in airway inflammation, hyperreactivity, and increased mucus production. These symptoms could result from pendrin's effects on ion concentration in the airway surface liquid, possibly causing the liquid to be less hydrated.

References

Further reading

External links 
  GeneReviews/NCBI/NIH/UW entry on Pendred Syndrome/DFNB4
 Description at oto.wustl.edu
 

Solute carrier family
Thyroid
Integral membrane proteins